Sant'Alberto Solar Park is a 34.63 MW photovoltaic power plant in Emilia-Romagna, Italy, which has been combined with a sheep dairy farm, as a clean energy project.

The Sant'Alberto Solar Park is one of the largest photovoltaic plants in Italy. It is one of the largest in installed capacity and size, and the first to be designed in an integrated manner to an extensive breeding of sheep. The method is called "pratopascolo photovoltaic" because it enhances the local environmental context. The park has been prepared in an area for the management and care of the pasture with the presence of local milking and milk-processing, with manger, for dairy products. The plant consists of crystalline silicon photovoltaic modules.

See also 

 List of photovoltaic power stations
 Solar power in Italy

References 

Photovoltaic power stations in Italy